Labeobarbus pojeri is a species of ray-finned fish in the genus Labeobarbus is endemic to the Lukuga River in the Democratic Republic of the Congo.

References 

pojeri
Taxa named by Max Poll
Fish described in 1944
Endemic fauna of the Democratic Republic of the Congo